The pindani (Pseudotropheus socolofi) is a species of cichlid endemic to Lake Malawi preferring areas with sandy substrates and nearby rocks where the males establish their territories.  This species can reach a length of  SL.  It can also be found in the aquarium trade. The specific name of this fish honours the aquarium fish trader  Ross Socolof (1925-2009).

References

Pindani
Pindani
Taxa named by Donald S. Johnson
Fish described in 1974
Taxonomy articles created by Polbot
Taxobox binomials not recognized by IUCN